Daag: The Fire (English: Stain) is a 1999 Indian Hindi-language action thriller film written, produced and directed by Raj Kanwar, starring Sanjay Dutt, Chandrachur Singh and Mahima Chaudhry in the lead roles. The film received mixed reviews but achieved Superhit status at the end of its theatrical run. One of the strongest criticisms was that despite the title, there was neither a stain nor a fire. Raj Kanwar claimed that the title was a reference to the dualism intrinsic to nature, such as the Yin and the Yang. This was, however, lost on viewers. The plot was inspired from the 1991 movie, Regarding Henry.

Plot 
A former Indian soldier Karan Singh (Sanjay Dutt), wants to seek revenge for his upright father Satya Prakash Singh (Shivaji Satam), who was wrongly placed in jail because he is falsely accused and prosecuted by a shrewd lawyer Ravi Verma (Chandrachur Singh)  who is backed up by his father in law Singhal (Raj Babbar).

Singhal's daughter Kajal, is the wife of corrupt lawyer Ravi, who can win almost any case. During a court case, he falsely accuses and gets a righteous man convicted of corruption, and he commits suicide out of disgrace. His son major Karan swears revenge and one day after a party that Kajal and Ravi attended, fires a pistol directly at Ravi, but his wife Kajal (Mahima Chaudhry)  comes in to save her husband using her body as a shield. Karan fires a second time, and Ravi is shot in the spinal cord and loses part of his memory, and the doctors diagnose him with 'retrograde amnesia".

In the hospital, Kajal succumbs to her wound and dies. As an attempt to restore Ravi's memory, Singhal requests the help of a street women Kajri, who looks exactly like Kajal (Mahima Chaudhry, in a dual role), to pretend to be Ravi's wife temporarily.

However, obstinate Karan is still seeking his revenge by stalking Ravi in the hospital and hatches a plan to kill Ravi. Karan and Kajri collect all the evidence that proves Karan's father's innocence. Ravi regains his memory and starts to sympathise with Karan. With the help of Kajri, he promises Karan that once he gains full recovery, he will prove to the court that Karan's father was genuinely innocent, but wrongly persecuted, presenting all the proof. Learning of this turn of events, Singhal turns the tables on Ravi.

A significant family feud ensues between Singhal and Ravi. Ravi, with the help from Karan, wins over the final court case, and finally, the real perpetrators are placed behind bars (including Singhal, who had instigated this). Ravi and Kajri unite happily at last, and Karan gives himself up to the police voluntarily.

Cast 
Sanjay Dutt as Captain Karan Singh     
Chandrachur Singh as Ravi Verma 
Mahima Chaudhry - as Kajal Verma (Nee Singhal) / Kajri (Double Role) 
Shakti Kapoor -  as Dr. Anand
Sachin Khedekar - as Inspector Vinay Kumar
Raj Babbar - as Mr. Singhal 
Kunika - as Nurse  
Johnny Lever- as Sunder
Shivaji Satam - as Satya Prakash Singh, Karan's father

Soundtrack 
"Pardesiya Itna Bata Sajna, dil deewana na jaane ( Anuradha Paudwal solo)" was very famous at the time of the movie release.
All Music by Rajesh Roshan. and Lyrics by Sameer.

Reception 
A critic from Deccan Herald opined that "Sanjay Dutt runs along the fringes of the storyline, making occasional incursions of zero impact. Chandrachur. with his flair and self-assured air puts Sanjay’s laboured outbursts to shame. A few spirited songs by Rajesh Roshan add some spice".

References

External links 
 

1990s Hindi-language films
1999 films
Indian action drama films
Films scored by Rajesh Roshan
Films with screenplays by Robin Bhatt
Films with screenplays by Akash Khurana
Films directed by Raj Kanwar
Films about amnesia
Indian films about revenge
1990s action drama films